Telescoping in mechanics describes the movement of one part sliding out from another, lengthening an object (such as a telescope or the lift arm of an aerial work platform) from its rest state. In modern equipment this can be achieved by a hydraulics, but pulleys are generally used for simpler designs such as extendable ladders and amateur radio antennas.

See also
 Telescopic cylinder 

Mechanics
Simple machines

References